= Procovery =

Procovery is a proprietary methodology focused on the process of how individuals with serious and chronic illnesses, trauma, addiction, injuries and loss can build healthier and more fulfilling lives, notwithstanding the possible continuing presence or worsening of symptoms or circumstances.

The concept of Procovery was created by writer Kathleen Crowley in 1996 and her program of Procovery principles and strategies, and Procovery Circles, resulted from years of research and interviews of individuals who found resilience, and those who supported and cared for them.
